Paul A. Bové (born 1949 in Philadelphia) is distinguished professor of English at the University of Pittsburgh and editor of the peer-reviewed academic journal of postmodern theory, literature, and culture Boundary 2, published by Duke University Press. Bové has been a member of the Pitt faculty since 1979 and was named a distinguished professor in 2005. Bové also holds affiliations with the Institute for Cultural Studies at the University of Valencia in Spain and the Centre for International Political Studies in Pretoria, South Africa. From 1994 to 1999 he served on the board of directors of the Institute of Postmodern Studies at Peking University.

Selected writings
Love's Shadow," Harvard UP 2021Poetry Against Torture: Criticism, History, and the HumanIn the Wake of TheoryMastering Discourse: The Politics of Intellectual CultureIntellectuals in Power: A Genealogy of Critical HumanismDestructive Poetics: Heidegger and Modern American PoetryA More Conservative Place: Intellectual Culture in the Bush EraEarly Postmodernism: Foundational Essay'', Durham, NC: Duke University, 1995

References

External links
Bové's homepage from University of Pittsburgh
Boundary 2 homepage from Duke University Press

1949 births
Living people
Writers from Philadelphia
American academics of English literature
University of Pittsburgh faculty
Journalists from Pennsylvania